Maria Rubia is an English model, TV presenter and singer-songwriter. She debuted as the vocalist on Fragma's dance song, "Everytime You Need Me", which remained on the UK Singles Chart for 11 weeks, and the sales thereof earned her a silver disc.

Discography

Singles
Fragma feat. Maria Rubia – "Everytime You Need Me" (2001) No. 3 UK
"Say It" (2001) No. 40 UK
Double N feat. Maria Rubia – "Forever and a Day" (2002)
Akyra feat. Maria Rubia – "Here Comes the Rain Again" (2003)
Fragma x Bodybangers remix ft. Maria Rubia "Everytime You Need Me" 2022
"Eye Of The Storm" (2022) released on Crazy Dog Records

References

External links
Official site

Living people
English female models
English songwriters
English television presenters
English women pop singers
21st-century English women singers
21st-century English singers
Year of birth missing (living people)